The City Bowl is a part of Cape Town in South Africa.  It is a natural amphitheatre-shaped area bordered by Table Bay and defined by the mountains of Signal Hill, Lion's Head, Table Mountain and Devil's Peak.

The area includes the central business district of Cape Town (CBD), the harbour, the Company's Garden, and the residential suburbs of De Waterkant, Devil's Peak Estate, District Six, Zonnebloem, Gardens, Higgovale, Oranjezicht, Schotsche Kloof, Tamboerskloof, University Estate, Vredehoek, Walmer Estate and Woodstock.

Central Business District 
Cape Town CBD in the City Bowl is a major business district in Cape Town’s metropolitan area and a financial centre of the Western Cape and South Africa. The South African parliament is located in Plein Street, and is the seat of government for six months in the year. The Western Cape provincial government and City of Cape Town metropolitan municipality also have their head offices in the Cape Town CBD.

Foreshore Freeway bridge 

The Foreshore Freeway Bridge has stood in its unfinished state since construction officially ended in 1977. It was intended to be the Eastern Boulevard Highway in the city bowl, but is unfinished due to budget constraints.

Gallery

External links

 Satellite imagery from Google Maps in which bowl shape of City Bowl is clearly visible

 
Cape Town
Articles containing video clips